Le Favril may refer to the following communes in France:

Le Favril, Eure, in the Eure département
Le Favril, Eure-et-Loir, in the Eure-et-Loir département 
Le Favril, Nord, in the Nord département